The following is a list of all awardees of the Ten Accomplished Youth Organizations (TAYO) Awards from 2003 to 2020.

Awardees

References 

Award winners from the Philippines